Vancouver House is a neo-futurist residential skyscraper in Vancouver, British Columbia, Canada.

Overview

Construction of the skyscraper began in 2016 and was expected to be finished by the end of 2019, but completion was postponed to summer of 2020.

Design
Vancouver House was designed by Danish architect Bjarke Ingels. The design is based on a triangle that rises from the ground and gradually transitions into a rectangle as it ascends to the top. The design reflects the constraints of developing the triangular-shaped plot of land immediately east of the Howe Street on-ramp of the Granville Street Bridge. The east and west facades of the building feature box-shaped balconies, giving the building's exterior a honeycomb texture.

Spinning Chandelier, a public art piece, was installed near the skyscraper as part of the city's rezoning requirement.

See also

List of tallest buildings in Vancouver
List of tallest buildings in British Columbia

References

Skyscrapers in Vancouver
Bjarke Ingels buildings